Jérémy Blayac (born 13 June 1983) is a French former professional footballer who played as a forward.

Career
Born in Saint-Affrique, Blayac began his career as part of the youth academy at French club Toulouse FC. He left the club in 2004, to join Ligue 2 side Stade de Reims. He stayed here only one season, before having two stints at AS Cannes, with a season at LB Châteauroux in between. In 2008, he joined French second tier club US Boulogne.

On 29 January 2011, he made his Tours FC debut in a 1–3 defeat to Clermont. After four matches played in the league, he scored his first goal for Tours on 18 February 2011, at Stade de la Vallée du Cher, helping his side to a 1–0 win against Troyes.

Blayac retired at the end of the 2018–19 season.

References

External links
 
 Profile on Eurosport
 Profile on Tours FC
 

Living people
1983 births
Association football forwards
French footballers
Ligue 2 players
Ligue 1 players
Championnat National players
US Boulogne players
Toulouse FC players
Stade de Reims players
AS Cannes players
LB Châteauroux players
Tours FC players
Angers SCO players
RC Strasbourg Alsace players
Gazélec Ajaccio players